Kamikaze Missions is an album by American hardcore band Backstabbers Incorporated.  It was their second release for Trash Art! (the first was an EP entitled While You Were Sleeping in 2001) and it is their first full-length release made up entirely of new material.  The album featured a notable expansion of their style that now incorporated a more diverse array of extreme metal and hardcore influences in longer song structures.  It was the band's final release.

Track listing

References 

2004 albums
Backstabbers Incorporated albums
Trash Art! albums